Elfin (Elven) facies is a form of facies where the patient presents with facial characteristics bearing some similarities to those traditionally associated with elves. It is characterized by prominent forehead, widely spaced eyes, upturned nose, underdeveloped mandible, dental hypoplasia, and patulous lips.

It can be associated with Williams syndrome or Donohue syndrome (which is also known as leprechaunism).

References

Medical signs